is a Japanese footballer who plays for Júbilo Iwata.

Career statistics
Updated as of end of 2022 season.

References

External links
Profile at Júbilo Iwata

1986 births
Living people
Association football people from Mie Prefecture
Japanese footballers
J1 League players
J2 League players
Júbilo Iwata players
Association football goalkeepers